The National Film Department of Malaysia, abbreviated FNM, sometimes Jabatan Filem Negara (JFN) or informally the Malaysian Film Unit; was a Malaysian state-owned film organization. It is the country's first film studio and the government department under the Malaysian Ministry of Communications and Multimedia, which was responsible for the filming and documentation of national events as well as producing factual and unscripted contents. In its heyday, FNM became the country's most prominent film agency. Its corporate emblem features a jumping Malayan tiger, which was synonymous with the agency and its headquarters were located in Petaling Jaya, Selangor.

Among the main functions of FNM was to spread the information about the policy, programme and achievement of the government and to promote the country through the films produced. Other than that, FNM was tasked to produce and supply high quality documentary films, public service announcement (PSA) and trailers to its clients. FNM was to be the official government film producing organisation with the high international level. Filem Negara Malaysia has produced more than 2000 documentary films in total, earning them numerous local and international awards.

In 2013, Filem Negara Malaysia was merged with the National Film Development Corporation Malaysia (FINAS) to form a sole film agency.

History 
Prior to 22 November 1963, the National Film Department (NFD) was known as the Malayan Film Unit (MFU). The Malayan Film Unit was founded by Mubin Sheppard who was then working in the Department of Public Relations after the World War II ends and uses his own earnings to buy a film equipment from the British military film team which was to be auctioned in Singapore. It started its operations in April 1946 and was based in Jalan Bangsar, Kuala Lumpur. It was a unit under the National Communications Department (Jabatan Perhubungan Raya), thereafter known as the Department of Information.

The present National Film Department complex is situated at Jalan Utara, Petaling Jaya. It was officiated by the third Yang di-Pertuan Agong, Al-Marhum Tuanku Syed Putra Ibni Al-Marhum Syed Hassan Jamalullail on 24 August 1965. In his inaugural speech during the official opening ceremony of the NFD's new complex, Allahyarham Datuk Senu bin Abdul Rahman, the then Information and Broadcasting Minister, had announced that the ministry decided to incorporate NFD to be one of its departments.

Filem Negara Malaysia announced on November 1968 that all documentary and feature films will be produced in color instead of black and white by 1969. The plan for colour films have been discussed in 1963.

By 1967, they publish a newsreel, Malaysia: A Week in which every week since the beginning of the year, they published newsreels within a week of the events taking place. Also in the same year, Filem Negara announced that they would sold 51 percent of its stake to the Malaysian public in order to be the Malaysia's premiere film corporation.

On every celebration season FNM would always produce advertisements or short stories of 2 to 3 minutes based on the theme of compassion, unity, culture, courtesy and the respect to the elders that always show on the TV screen. FNM which was equipped with production and editing facilities was confident that it would not have any problem to produce short programmes.

It is undeniable that since its formation over half century, FNM had produced hundreds of good products until it received many recognitions in many festival or international awards in documentary, short story or animation category. FNM also ever received recognitions in a few films produced such as Bila Hati Telah Retak, Dayang Suhana or Embun.

Documentaries or short stories such as Before The Wind, Building Bonny Babies, The Letter, Buffaloes For Floughing and Letter From Home produced in 1954, or Hassan's Home Coming, Youth In Action and Malacca Then And Now (1955), Rohani's Steps Out, Valley of Hope, Timeless Temiar and Malayan University (1956) and also Wayang Kulit, Tin From Malaya (1957) are some of the best products ever produced by FNM until it received many recognitions from Philippines, Japan, Canada, Hong Kong and Cambodia.

FNM also ever produced documentaries about the country unity and independence like Merdeka For Malaya, United We Stand, Master Farmer Kum Yeng, No Need To Be Poor and Bapa Malaysia which are the best products that should be shown again on TV.

In November 2012, former Information, Communication and Culture Minister, Rais Yatim announced that FNM and National Film Development Corporation Malaysia (FINAS) will be merged to form a sole film organization. The merger was completed on May 31, 2013 and Filem Negara Malaysia itself renamed as FINAS completely after the combined of both entities. As a result of this merger, many of the Filem Negara's existing or new staffs and workers have been let go while others were transferred to FINAS. The decision of merger between Filem Negara and FINAS was proposed in 1991, but delayed several times due to legal issues.

Branch office
NFD has a branch office situated at Kompleks RTM, Jalan P. Ramlee, Kuching, Sarawak. Sarawak's NFD branch, which was established in the mid 1960s, used to be the Sarawak Information Department Film Unit with the role of broadcasting and screening films produced by the NFD.

Sarawak's NFD branch has broadened its functions in covering the national events and producing films on Sarawak, Sabah and the Federal Territory of Labuan.

Corporate identity
The NFD's corporate logo was created by Gillie Potter, who was then the Art Director at the agency's Motion Pictures Division. He had incorporated the picture of a Malayan tiger in the logo to symbolise activeness, patience and strength. These traits were crucial for the NFD at that time as it was facing many obstacles to prove its capability. Following the name change from Malayan Film Unit to Filem Negara Malaysia in November 1963, a new version of the tiger emblem was adopted.

Act and functions
Filem Negara Malaysia's functions are clearly defined by an Act of Parliament which is the Functions of Ministries Act, 1969 P.U (A) 126 - Film Division and Production.

Among the functions of the department include:
 Production of documentary films and trailers
 Coverage of national events (archive)
 Storage and restoration of audio visual aids
 Selling of films and audio visual storage
 Distribution of the department's produced films
 Providing filming services
 The rental of the department's produced films

List of productions

Films
 Abu Nawas (1957)
 Gema Dari Menara (1968) - Brunei's first-ever feature film, produced for Brunei Religious Department
 Anak Seluang Jauh Melaut (1975)
 Dayang Suhana (1978)
 Bila Hati Telah Retak (1983)
 Ke Medan Jaya (1983)
 Cempaka Biru (1989)
 Embun (2002)
 Paloh (2003)

Animations

'Hikayat Sang Kancil' series
 Sang Kancil (1983)
 Sang Kancil dan Sang Monyet (1984)
 Sang Kancil dan Sang Buaya (1985)

'Kisah dan Teladan' series
 Arnab yang Sombong (1986)
 Singa yang Haloba (1986)
 Gagak yang Bijak (1986)
 Telur Sebiji Riuh Sekampung (1995)
 Budi Baik Dibalas Baik (1995)

Documentary films

As Malayan Film Unit
 Kinta Story (1950)
 Wanted For Murder (1951)
 Brunei: Abode of Peace (1952)
 Acting on Information (1952) 
 Badminton, Thomas Cup Matches (1952)
 Before The Wind (1953)
 A Better Man (1953)
 Buffaloes For Ploughing (1953)
 Padi Kunca (1954)
 Rohani Maju Mulia (1954)
 Youth in Action (1955)
 Malacca: Then and Now (1955)
 Timeless Temiar (1956)
 Wayang Kulit (1956)
 Big Kitchen (1957)
 Menuju Kemerdekaan (1957)
 Merdeka For Malaya (1957)
 Ali Finds a Secret (1958)
 Brunei (1958)
 Brunei Merayakan (1958)
 Brunei Welcomes Their Majesties (1959)
 The Big Vote (1959)
 Anika Warna (1959)
 Batu Caves (1960)
 The Year 1961 (1961)
 Malaya (1961)
 Aboard for Congo (1961)
 Bulan Bahasa (1961)
 Bahasa Menyatukan Bangsa (1961)
 Safar (1962)
 Lembaran Baru (1962)
 Borneo Welcomes Tunku (1962)
 Perjanjian Malaysia (1962)
 Ashkar Melayu Brunei (1962)
 Cities of Malaya (1962)
 Kembali Ka-Brunei (1963)
 Building Bonny Babies (1963)
 Milestones To Malaysia (1963)

As Filem Negara Malaysia
 Kelahiran Malaysia (1963)
 Bulan Bahasa Kebangsaan (1963)
 Bahasa Bangaan Bangsa (1963)
 Kebangkitan Malaysia (1964)
 Mata Permata (1964)
 Bintara (1964)
 Bahasa Peribadi Bangsa (1964)
 Bapa Malaysia (1964)
 Blatant Aggression (1964)
 Seruan Suchi (1965)
 Commonwealth in Malaysia (1965)
 To Regret Is Already Too Late (1966)
 Berkhidmat Memimpin Umat (1966)
 Saka Pengharapan (1966)
 Tun Mustapha (1966)
 Bersatu Berjaya (1966)
 Kesah Kampong Kita: Dewasa Membawa Bahagia (1967)
 Kesah Kampong Kita: Semangat Padi Baru (1967)
 Atap Genting Atap Rumbia (1967)
 Antara Dua Jiwa (1967)
 Sopan Santun Makan Bersuap (1969)
 Kesah Kampong Kita: Jiwa Merdeka (1969)
 1st Asian Highway Motor Rally (1969)
 Kesah Kampong Kita: Keazaman Puncha Kemaamoran (1970)
 Mara Bersama Rukun Negara (1971)
 Perjuangan Kami Menentang Penyamun Komunis (1972)
 Sinar Bahagia (1972) 
 Gasing (1973)
 Bersatu Bertambah Mutu (1978)
 Berselang-Seli (1980)
 Detik Gemilang Dalam Sejarah (1980)
 Dikir Barat (1984)
 Trez Amigos (1986)
 Istiadat Perkahwinan Di-Raja Pahang dan Johor (1986)
 Awasi Jerat Dadah (1986)
 Dari Desa Ke Kampus (1987)
 Keajaiban Tabii (1988)
 Pertemuan Di Ambang Adat Lama (1990)
 Dalam Kenangan Tuanku Abdul Rahman (1990)
 Mandela Pejuang Kebebasan (1990)
 Kejohanan Piala Thomas (1992)
 Pua Kumbu (1993)
 Kehidupan Beragama di Malaysia (1994)
 World's Wonder Mulu (1996)
 Taman Negara: Destinasi Alam Semulajadi (1998)

See also
 National Film Development Corporation Malaysia (FINAS)

Notes

References

External links
  (archived)

Former federal ministries, departments and agencies of Malaysia
Malaysia
State-owned film companies
1946 establishments in British Malaya
Government agencies established in 1946
2013 disestablishments in Malaysia
Government agencies disestablished in 2013
Public service announcement organizations